The Apokapes or Apocapes, plural Apokapai, was an Armeno-Georgian noble family members of which are known to have held important positions in the Byzantine military administration in the 11th century. Among its more notable members was Basil Apokapes.

Byzantine families
Nobility of Georgia (country)
Armenian nobility
Byzantine people of Armenian descent
Byzantine people of Georgian descent